Amanita strobiliformis is a species of mushroom. It is commonly referred to as warted amanita.

Description
The cap is 3 to 10 inches across, is rough with warts which sometimes fall away leaving the cap smooth, whitish, and sometimes has some brown. The gills are free and rounded behind. The  veil is large and sometimes adhere to the margin of the cap. The stipe (stem) is 3 to 8 inches long, thick, white, bulbous, and sometimes weighs a pound. The spores are elliptical.

Edibility

Unknown

The genus Amanita contains some of the most toxic fungi known. Some amanitas are deadly in only very small doses, while others are relatively harmless and sometimes even considered fit for human consumption. There are different views on A. strobiliformis edibility. Some sources advise against consuming them, other sources consider them edible.

Habitat
Amanita strobiliformis is associated mycorhizal with deciduous trees, preferring scattered forest, or woodland borders, usually on alkaline soil. It grows singular fruits and sometimes clusters. The fungus is rare.

In Europe, it grows from the Mediterranean region to the Netherlands and England, and maybe further north.

Gallery

References

External links 

strobiliformis
Fungi of North America